There's an Innocent Face, released in 1973, is the only solo album that American musician Curt Boettcher completed during his life. He was assisted throughout the recording by a young multi-instrumentalist, Web Burrell.   Boettcher (spelt "Boetcher" on the record) was somewhat enamored by the early Emitt Rhodes solo albums, and wanted to make the album in a similar fashion.   He used only a few musicians on the record, in direct contrast to his 1960s productions. It stands in direct contrast to most of his work because it relies almost exclusively on outside songwriting.

It has been reissued on CD by Sundazed Records.

Track listing
"I Love You More Each Day" (Web Burrell, Curt Boettcher, Don Gere) - 2:36
"Such a Lady" (Constantine Gusias, Randy Naylor) - 2:03
"She'll Stay with You" (Don Gere) - 2:19
"Love You Yes I Do" (Jerry Netkin, Curt Boettcher, Web Burrell) - 3:14
"Without Her" (Constantine Gusias) - 1:23
"Bobby California" (Don Gere) - 4:34
"The Choice Is Yours" (Mickey Rooney Jr., Tim Rooney) - 2:08
"Malachi Star" (Judi Pulver, Waddy Wachtel) - 2:44
"Lay Down" (Don Gere) - 3:21
"I've Been Wrong" (Don Gere) - 3:34
"Wufferton Frog" (Jerry Netkin) - 4:02

Personnel 
Curt Boettcher, Web Burrell - vocals, guitar
Web Burrell - drums
Red Rhodes - steel guitar
Skip Konte - keyboards
Les Thornton (A1), Willis Masonheimer (A1, B5) - tuba
Ric DeLong, Web Burrell - bass
Wayne Yentis - ARP synthesizer
Production: Gary Usher, Curt Boettcher, Web Burrell

References

External links
Curt Boetcher 'There's an Innocent Face' 1973

Curt Boettcher albums
1973 debut albums
Albums produced by Curt Boettcher
Albums with cover art by Jimmy Wachtel
Elektra Records albums